Decazesia is a genus of flowering plants in the family Asteraceae.

There is only one known species, Decazesia hecatocephala, endemic to Western Australia.

References

Flora of Western Australia
Monotypic Asteraceae genera
Gnaphalieae
Taxa named by Ferdinand von Mueller